Doto eireana is a species of sea slug, a nudibranch, a marine gastropod mollusc in the family Dotidae.

Distribution
This species was first described from Galway Bay, Ireland. It has subsequently been reported widely in Britain and Ireland.

Description
This nudibranch is translucent white with dark red spots on the ceratal tubercles.

EcologyDoto eireana feeds on the hydroid Amphisbetia operculata'', family Sertulariidae.

References

Dotidae
Gastropods described in 1976